Football Club Deportivo Galicia is a football club based in London, England.

History
The club was established in 1968 under the name Centro Gallego and joined the West Fulham League. A split during the 1971–72 season saw another club formed under the name FC Deportivo Galicia, with the two clubs merging under the latter name in 1975, at which point they were playing in the Harlesden Sunday League.

Deportivo Galicia switched to Saturday football when they joined Division Two of the Middlesex County League in 1995. The club went on to win the division at the first attempt, earning promotion to Division One. They were Division One runners-up the following season and were promoted to the Premier Division. Although the club finished bottom of the Premier Division in 1997–98, they were not relegated to the (renamed) Senior Division. They finished bottom of the division again in 2006–07 and 2008–09, but avoided being relegated on both occasions.

In 2016–17 Deportivo Galicia were Premier Division champions, earning promotion to Division One of the Combined Counties League.

Ground
The club have played at several grounds, including CB Hounslow United's Osterley Sports Club. In 2015 they moved to Edgware Town's Silver Jubilee Park, before relocating to the Bedfont Recreation Ground the following year.

Honours
Middlesex County League
Premier Division champions 2016–17
Division Two champions 1995–96

Records
Best FA Vase performance: First round, 2018–19

References

External links

Football clubs in England
Football clubs in London
1968 establishments in England
Association football clubs established in 1968
Middlesex County Football League
Combined Counties Football League
Diaspora association football clubs in England